Rhodesia competed at the 1960 Summer Olympics in Rome, Italy.  It was the first time in 32 years that the nation was represented at the Olympic Games. Fourteen athletes—Southern Rhodesians and one Northern Rhodesian, boxer Abe Bekker—competed under the name Rhodesia while representing the Federation of Rhodesia and Nyasaland (1953–1963).

Athletics

Boxing

Diving

Sailing

Shooting

One shooter represented Rhodesia in 1960.

Trap
 Bill Gulliver

Swimming

See also
 Rhodesia at the 1960 Summer Paralympics

References

External links
Official Olympic Reports

Nations at the 1960 Summer Olympics
1960
1960 in Southern Rhodesia
1960 in the Federation of Rhodesia and Nyasaland
History of the Federation of Rhodesia and Nyasaland
1960
1960
1960